Irwing "Irwin" Armando Rivera (born February 14, 1989) is a Mexican mixed martial artist who competes in the Bantamweight division of the Eagle Fighting Championship. A professional mixed martial artist since 2014, Rivera has competed for Combate Americas, Ultimate Fighting Championship and Titan FC where he was the Bantamweight Champion.

Background
Rivera was born in Ciudad Nezahualcóyotl, Mexico, but immigrated with his parents to New Windsor, New York where he grew up. He has a younger sister Kelly, older sister Lezlye and a brother. Rivera initially trained for boxing, but dabbled into mixed martial arts after his boxing gym closed its doors.

Mixed martial arts career

Titan FC
After getting cut from Combate Americas, Rivera made his Titan Fighting Championship debut against Edir Terry at Titan FC 48 on February 16, 2018. He lost the fight due to technical knockout stemming from a leg injury.

Rivera made his sophomore appearance in Titan FC against Lazar Stojadinovic at Titan FC 53 on March 15, 2019. He won the fight via first-round knockout.

Rivera then faced Matt Wagy for the interim Titan FC Bantamweight Championship at Titan FC 55 on June 28, 2019. Rivera claimed the interim championship via fourth-round technical knockout stemming from a body punch. On November 11, 2019, Rivera was elevated to undisputed Bantamweight Champion after the reigning champion Rudson Caliocane vacated the title.

For his first title defense, Rivera faced Danny Sabatello at Titan FC 58 on December 20, 2019. Rivera retained his title via fourth-round technical knockout. In May 2020, Rivera vacated his title in order to sign with the Ultimate Fighting Championship.

Ultimate Fighting Championship
Replacing Mike Davis on two days' notice, Rivera signed with the UFC and faced Giga Chikadze in a featherweight bout at UFC Fight Night 172 on May 16, 2020. He lost the fight via unanimous decision.

Rivera made his second appearance in the organization at UFC Fight Night: Lewis vs. Oleinik on August 8, 2020 against Ali AlQaisi. He won the fight via split decision.

Rivera faced Andre Ewell on September 19, 2020 at UFC Fight Night 178. He lost the fight via split decision.

Rivera was scheduled to face Ray Rodriguez on March 13, 2021 at UFC Fight Night 187. Due to the two counts arrest of attempted murder of his two sisters, UFC rescinded their bout negotiation.

Eagle Fighting Championship 
Rivera faced Firdavs Khasanov at Eagle FC 46 on March 11, 2022. He won the bout in the second round after dropping Khasanov with a body kick and then finishing him with ground and pound.

Legal troubles 

In January 2021, Rivera was arrested on two counts of attempted murder in Palm Beach County, Florida after he allegedly stabbed his two sisters. He was booked into the Palm Beach County jail and held without bail. On January 8, it was revealed that Rivera was being kept in a mental health facility rather than in jail. His sisters also broke their silence, stating that they love Irwin and that all that they wish for their brother is for him to get the help that he needs for his mental state. Irwin was granted a conditional release from custody on October 19, 2021, after the judge in the case approved Rivera’s plea of not guilty by reason of insanity. He was diagnosed with Bipolar I disorder and it was determined that he was having a psychotic episode at the time of the stabbings.

Personal life
Rivera has a daughter (born 2016) from his previous relationship.

Championships and accomplishments
Titan FC
Titan FC Bantamweight Champion (one time)
One successful title defense

Mixed martial arts record

|-
| Win
| align=center| 11–6
| Firdavs Khasanov
| TKO (body kick and punches)
| Eagle FC 46
| 
| align=center|2
| align=center|4:48
| Miami, Florida, United States
|
|-
| Loss
| align=center| 10–6
| Andre Ewell
| Decision (split)
| UFC Fight Night: Covington vs. Woodley
| 
| align=center|3
| align=center|5:00
| Las Vegas, Nevada, United States
|
|-
| Win
| align=center| 10–5
| Ali AlQaisi
| Decision (split)
| UFC Fight Night: Lewis vs. Oleinik
| 
| align=center|3
| align=center|5:00
| Las Vegas, Nevada, United States
|
|-
| Loss
| align=center| 9–5
| Giga Chikadze
| Decision (unanimous)
| UFC on ESPN: Overeem vs. Harris 
| 
| align=center|3
| align=center|5:00
| Jacksonville, Florida, United States
| 
|-
| Win
| align=center| 9–4
| Danny Sabatello
| TKO (punch to the body)
| Titan FC 58
| 
| align=center| 4
| align=center| 4:26
| Fort Lauderdale, Florida, United States
| 
|-
| Win
| align=center| 8–4
| Matt Wagy
| TKO (punch to the body)
| Titan FC 55
| 
| align=center| 4
| align=center| 4:18
| Fort Lauderdale, Florida, United States
| 
|-
| Win
| align=center| 7–4
| Lazar Stojadinovic
| TKO (punches and head kick)
| Titan FC 53
| 
| align=center| 1
| align=center| 1:40
| Fort Lauderdale, Florida, United States
|
|-
| Loss
| align=center| 6–4
| Edir Terry
| TKO (leg injury)
| Titan FC 48
| 
| align=center| 1
| align=center| 1:05
| Coral Gables, Florida, United States
|
|-
| Win
| align=center| 6–3
| Chino Duran
| Decision (unanimous)
| Combate Americas: Combate Clasico
| 
| align=center| 3
| align=center| 5:00
| Miami, Florida, United States
|
|-
| Loss
| align=center| 5–3
| Kevin Natividad
| Decision (majority)
| Combate Americas: Combate 13
| 
| align=center| 3
| align=center| 5:00
| Tucson, Arizona, United States
|
|-
| Loss
| align=center| 5–2
| Jose Ceja
| KO (punches)
| Combate Americas: Empire Rising
| 
| align=center| 1
| align=center| 4:22
| Verona, New York, United States
|
|-
| Win
| align=center| 5–1
| Jose Ceja
| Submission (rear-naked choke)
| Legacy FC 52
| 
| align=center| 3
| align=center| 4:45
| Lake Charles, Louisiana, United States
|
|-
| Loss
| align=center| 4–1
| Steven Peterson
| Decision (unanimous)
| Legacy FC 46
| 
| align=center| 3
| align=center| 5:00
| Allen, Texas, United States
|
|-
| Win
| align=center| 4–0
| Adi Alić
| Decision (unanimous)
| Fight Time 25: It's Fight Time in the Magic City
| 1
| align=center| 3
| align=center| 5:00
| Miami, Florida, United States
|
|-
| Win
| align=center| 3–0
| Chris Navarro
| KO (punches)
| Fight Time 23: Mayhem in Miami
| 
| align=center| 1
| align=center| 4:58
| Miami, Florida, United States
|
|-
| Win
| align=center| 2–0
| John Rivera
| TKO (punches)
| Fight Time 22: Autism Speaks!
| 
| align=center| 1
| align=center| 0:34
| Sunny Isles Beach, Florida, United States
|
|-
| Win
| align=center| 1–0
| Andre Cuff
| Decision (split)
| Fight Time 21: Soares vs. Barroso
| 
| align=center| 3
| align=center| 5:00
| Fort Lauderdale, Florida, United States
|

See also 
 List of male mixed martial artists

References

External links 
  
 

Living people
Bantamweight mixed martial artists
Mixed martial artists utilizing boxing
Mixed martial artists utilizing Brazilian jiu-jitsu
1989 births
Mexican male mixed martial artists
Ultimate Fighting Championship male fighters
Mexican practitioners of Brazilian jiu-jitsu